For the Eurovision Song Contest 1990 in Zagreb, the song "Somewhere in Europe", written, composed and performed by Liam Reilly, was chosen to represent Ireland after it won the national final selection.

Before Eurovision

National final 
Held on 25 March 1990 at the Gaiety Theatre in Dublin, the national final was hosted by Jimmy Greeley and Cliona Ni Bhuachalla. Eight songs competed in the event, and the winner was selected by twelve regional juries.

Liam Reilly had previously competed in Ireland's 1988 national final, where he placed second behind Jump the Gun. Linda Martin was runner-up to Sweden in the 1984 contest.

At Eurovision 
"Somewhere In Europe" was performed 17th in the running order on the night of the contest, following Portugal and preceding Sweden. At the close of the voting sequence, Ireland had 132 points, tying them with France for second place.

Both Greeley and Ní Bhuachalla provided the Irish Television commentary for RTÉ 1 television viewers, with Larry Gogan commentating for RTÉ Radio 1 listeners. Eileen Dunne served as spokesperson for the Irish jury.

Voting

References

1990
Countries in the Eurovision Song Contest 1990
Eurovision
Eurovision